Markus Poukkula (born September 24, 1988) is a Finnish professional ice hockey player who currently playing for Brûleurs de Loups  of the French Synerglace Ligue Magnus.

Playing career
Poukkula made his professional debut in his native Finland with JYP Jyväskylä of the then SM-liiga. After parts of 7 seasons within the Liiga, Poukkula left Finland as a mid-season transfer from the Espoo Blues, to sign his first contract abroad in Germany with top flight club, Schwenninger Wild Wings of the DEL for the remainder of the 2015–16 season on January 17, 2016.

Having contributed with 8 points in 14 games as Schwenninger missed the post-season, Poukkula was signed to a one-year contract extension to remain with the Wild Wings on March 13, 2016.

References

External links

1988 births
Living people
Espoo Blues players
JYP Jyväskylä players
SaiPa players
Schwenninger Wild Wings players
Finnish ice hockey forwards
People from Raahe
Sportspeople from North Ostrobothnia